Merrill is a township in Hettinger County, North Dakota, United States. The population was 13 at the 2000 census.

References

Townships in Hettinger County, North Dakota
Townships in North Dakota